William Downing Webster (11 May 1868 – 14 January 1913) was a British ethnographic dealer and collector, best known for his collection gathered from material seized by British troops during the Benin Expedition of 1897.

Life
Webster was born in 1868 in Greenwich to Robert and Sarah Webster. Although his father was in the potato trade, Webster was initially employed as a stained glass designer in Lancaster before becoming a dealer in ethnographic antiquities in the 1890s. In 1891 he married Agnes Harrison in Kendal. His marriage broke up and he separated from his wife and two daughters. He later lived with Eva Cutter, another ethnographic and antiquities dealer and the daughter of William D. Cutter,  in London.  He died from alcoholism in Effingham in 1913 and is reportedly buried at Kensal Green Cemetery.

Career as a Dealer and Collector
Webster began dealing in an collecting ethnographic antiquities in the 1890s. He published a series of catalogues detailing his collection during the next two decades. A number of them had sketches and photographs representing the works he was trading. He also staged a number of exhibitions of ethnographic material at Earl's Court. In 1899 he travelled throughout Britain purchasing material from British soldiers returning from the Benin Expedition, amassing a large quantity of material that was carefully recorded in his catalogues. He kept good business records recording his correspondence and stock movements.  In 1904 he sold the entirety of his collection in a five-day auction in London.

His business records were acquired by William Ockleford Oldman possibly purchased at the 1904 auction. These records were later acquired by the New Zealand Government when it purchased the Oldman collection in 1944 and are now owned by the Museum of New Zealand Te Papa Tongarewa.

References
 

1868 births
English art dealers
1913 deaths
Burials at Kensal Green Cemetery
Collectors
19th-century English businesspeople